Fabian Chavez Jr. (August 31, 1924 – January 20, 2013) was an American politician in the state of New Mexico and Majority Leader of the New Mexico Senate.

Biography
Chavez was born in 1924 in Wagon Mound, New Mexico, one of 10 children. He graduated from Santa Fe High School and served in World War II. Chavez later attended St. Michael's College and the University of New Mexico. Chavez was elected as a Democrat to the New Mexico House of Representatives in 1950 and to the New Mexico Senate in 1956, becoming Majority Leader in 1961 and serving until 1965.

Chavez was the Democratic nominee for Governor of New Mexico in the 1968 election, losing to incumbent David Cargo by 3,000 votes. He also mounted unsuccessful campaigns for U.S. Congress in 1964 and 1970 and Governor in 1982. After his defeat, he served as New Mexico Director of Tourism from 1971–75 and Director of Development from 1975–77. Chavez served as United States Assistant Secretary of Commerce for Tourism under President Jimmy Carter.

Chavez died on January 20, 2013, at the age of 88, after a short illness.

Personal life
Chavez and his wife, Coral Jeanne Rustenbach, were married 54 years before her death in 2006. They had one child, Christine J. Chavez Barrett, two grandchildren, and nine great grandchildren

References

1924 births
2013 deaths
Hispanic and Latino American state legislators in New Mexico
Democratic Party members of the New Mexico House of Representatives
Democratic Party New Mexico state senators
People from Mora County, New Mexico
People from Santa Fe, New Mexico
University of New Mexico alumni
Candidates in the 1970 United States elections
Candidates in the 1982 United States elections
20th-century American politicians